The 2018 Gateshead Metropolitan Borough Council election took place on 3 May 2018 to elect members of Gateshead Metropolitan Borough Council in England. This was on the same day as other local elections.

Election breakdown by ward

Birtley

Blaydon

Bridges

Chopwell and Rowlands Gill

Chowdene

Crawcrook and Greenside

Deckham

Dunston and Teams

Dunston Hill and Whickham East

Felling

High Fell

Lamesley

Lobley Hill and Bensham

Low Fell

Pelaw and Heworth

Ryton Crookhill and Stella

Saltwell

Wardley and Leam Lane

Whickham North

Whickham South and Sunniside

Windy Nook and Whitehills

Winlaton and High Spen

References

2018 English local elections
2018
21st century in Tyne and Wear